Blanodalmanites is a genus of trilobites in the order Phacopida, which existed in what is now Malaysia. It was described by Kobayashi and Hamada in 1972, and the type species is Blanodalmanites nubelania.

References

External links
 Blanodalmanites at the Paleobiology Database

Fossils of Malaysia
Phacopida genera